Arístides Mejía Carranza (born July 30, 1960) served as the Vice President Commissioner of Honduras from 1 February 2009 until 28 June 2009. The position of "Vice President Commissioner" was created by former President Manuel Zelaya after then-Vice President Elvin Santos resigned in late 2008. Arístides Mejía didn't fully occupied the charge, he was a Presidential Commissioner not a vice-president since he was appointed by President Zelaya and not popularly elected.

Biography
He is a son of Arístides Mejía and Orfilia Carranza. He was a lawyer at the National Autonomous University of Honduras. He was the Honduran Ambassador to Greece (1994–1998). Mejía was a part-time legal adviser of the International Organization for Migration (1999–2002), and the executive director of the Program for Modernization of the Administration of Justice. (1998–2003). He was the President and Judge of the Supreme Electoral Tribunal (2004–2005) and served as Secretary of National Defense from January 2006 until January 2009 under the presidency of Manuel Zelaya. He is married and father of three children: two daughters and a son. He speaks Spanish, French and English.

After the 2009 Honduran coup d'état Arístides Mejía chose to exile himself and do diplomatic work abroad to restore Manuel Zelaya in the presidency. As a consequence of the 2009 Honduran coup d'état, an arrest warrant was issued in Honduras for abuse of authority. Interpol however deemed that the warrant was due to political causes and declined to cooperate with the Honduran police force. On April 9, 2010, the charges were definitely dropped against him.

References

External links

Vice presidents of Honduras
1960 births
Living people
Ambassadors of Honduras to Greece
Liberal Party of Honduras politicians
Government ministers of Honduras
Universidad Nacional Autónoma de Honduras alumni